Gryllomorpha is a genus of cricket belonging to the family Gryllidae subfamily Gryllomorphinae. The species of this genus are present in Europe, in North Africa and in Central Asia.

Species
The Orthoptera Species File lists:
subgenus Gryllomorpha (Gryllomorpha) Fieber, 1853
 Gryllomorpha algerica Chopard, 1943
 Gryllomorpha brevicauda Bolívar, 1914
 Gryllomorpha bruehli Gorochov, 1993
 Gryllomorpha dalmatina (Ocskay, 1832) - type species (as Acheta dalmatina Ocskay = G. dalmatina dalmatina, one of 5 subspecies)
 Gryllomorpha fusca Chopard, 1943
 Gryllomorpha gestroana Bolívar, 1914
 Gryllomorpha gracilipes Chopard, 1943
 Gryllomorpha longicauda (Rambur, 1838)
 Gryllomorpha macrocephala Chopard, 1943
 Gryllomorpha maghzeni Bolívar, 1905
 Gryllomorpha minima Werner, 1914
 Gryllomorpha monodi Chopard, 1943
 Gryllomorpha occidentalis Gorochov, 2009
 Gryllomorpha rufescens Uvarov, 1924
 Gryllomorpha rungsi Chopard, 1943
 Gryllomorpha sovetica Gorochov, 2009
 Gryllomorpha sublaevis Chopard, 1943
 Gryllomorpha syriaca Harz, 1979
subgenus Gryllomorphella Gorochov, 1984
 Gryllomorpha albanica Ebner, 1910
 Gryllomorpha antalya Gorochov, 2009
 Gryllomorpha atlas Gorochov, 2009
 Gryllomorpha canariensis Chopard, 1939
 Gryllomorpha mira Gorochov, 1993
 Gryllomorpha miramae Medvedev, 1933
 Gryllomorpha robusta Gorochov, 2009
 Gryllomorpha segregata Gorochov, 2009
 Gryllomorpha sternlichti Chopard, 1963
 Gryllomorpha uclensis Pantel, 1890
 Gryllomorpha zonata Bolívar, 1914
subgenus Hymenoptila Chopard, 1943
 Gryllomorpha lanzarotensis (Kevan & Hsiung, 1992)
 Gryllomorpha panteli (Bolívar, 1914)
 Gryllomorpha rotundipennis (Chopard, 1939)
 Gryllomorpha zernyi Werner, 1934

References

External links
Images at iNaturalist
 

Crickets
Ensifera genera